This is a list of regular season and tournament champions in men's basketball of the NCAA Division I Ohio Valley Conference.

Men's basketball conference champions 
The Ohio Valley Conference basketball tournament was held in Louisville from 1949–55 and from 1964 to 1967.  From 1956 to 1963 and from 1968 to 1974, no tournament was held. From 1975 to 1991, the tournament was held at the arena of the team that finished atop the conference standings. It has been held at a neutral site since 1992.

Tournament championships by school
Former OVC members are indicated in italics.

See also
 Ohio Valley Conference women's basketball tournament

References

 
Basketball-related lists